{{DISPLAYTITLE:C28H48O6}}
The molecular formula C28H48O6 (molar mass: 480.69 g/mol, exact mass: 480.3451 u) may refer to:

 Brassinolide
 24-Epibrassinolide